Guerrero is a 2016 Peruvian biographical drama film directed by Fernando Villarán. It tells the story of soccer player Paolo Guerrero. The film was released in theaters on December 8, 2016 in Peru.

Synopsis
The film is a biopic that focuses on the figure of Peruvian soccer player Paolo Guerrero, from his humble childhood when he practiced soccer in his neighborhood to his international success and fame as the top scorer of the Peru national football team in 2016. Rony Shapiama, a 10-year-old actor, plays Guerrero as a child, while Paolo himself plays himself as an adult.

Cast
 Rony Shapiama as Paolo Guerrero as a child.
 Paolo Guerrero as himself.
 Magdyel Ugaz as Peta Gonzales.
 Paul Vega as José Guerrero.
 Lucho Cáceres as Guerrero's first coach.
 Javier Valdés as Constantino Carvallo.
 Rosa Guzman, as Guerrero's grandmother.

References

External links
 
2016 biographical drama films
Peruvian biographical drama films
Tondero Producciones films
2010s Peruvian films
2010s Spanish-language films
Biographical films about sportspeople
Films about sportspeople